Tangara may refer to:
 Tangara (bird), a genus of birds
 Aerotec A-132 Tangará, a Brazilian military trainer aircraft
 Tangará da Serra, a town in Mato Grosso, Brazil
 Tangará, Rio Grande do Norte, a town in Rio Grande do Norte, Brazil
 Tangará, Santa Catarina, a town in Santa Catarina, Brazil
 Tangara train or Sydney Trains T set, a class of electric multiple unit trains in Sydney, Australia
 Tangara (novel), a 1960 children's novel by Australian author Nan Chauncy

People with the surname
 Fousseiny Tangara (born 1978), Malian association football goalkeeper

See also
 Tangra (disambiguation)